Soyuz MS-05 was a Soyuz spaceflight which launched on 28 July 2017. It transported three members of the Expedition 52 crew to the International Space Station. Soyuz MS-05 was the 134th flight of a Soyuz spacecraft. The crew consisted of a Russian commander, and a European and an American flight engineer. It returned to Earth on 14 December 2017 after 139 days on orbit.

Spacecraft 

Soyuz MS introduces following upgrades: more efficient solar panels, the new Kurs-NA approach and docking system, which has a mass of less than half that of its predecessor, additional micro-meteoroid debris shielding, a modified docking and attitude control engine – which will add redundancy during docking and deorbit burns, a main computer, TsVM-101, which has a mass (8.3 kg) of only one-eighth that of its Argon-16 predecessor (70 kg) and a smaller volume, a unified digital command/telemetry system that allows telemetry to be transmitted via Luch relay satellites for control of the spacecraft as well as to provide crew with positioning data when the spacecraft is out of range of ground tracking stations and upgraded GLONASS / GPS and COSPAS-SARSAT satellite systems to provide more accurate location services during search/rescue operations after landing.

During the flight the spacecraft fulfills the following tasks: delivery of a visiting crew consisting of up to three persons and small accompanying cargoes, constant availability of the spacecraft, attached to the station during its crewed flight, in the standby mode to be ready for emergency descent of the main crew onto the ground in case of hazardous situation on the station, cosmonaut illness or injury, etc. (assured crew return vehicle function); planned descent of the visiting crew onto the ground, returning to the ground, together with the crew, payloads of relatively low mass and volume disposal of wastes from the station in the living compartment to be burned down in the atmosphere during descent.

Crew

Backup crew

References 

Crewed Soyuz missions
Spacecraft launched in 2017
2017 in Russia
Spacecraft launched by Soyuz-FG rockets
Spacecraft which reentered in 2017
Fully civilian crewed orbital spaceflights